Drymus crassus is a species of dirt-colored seed bugs in the family Rhyparochromidae. It is found in North America.

References

 Thomas J. Henry, Richard C. Froeschner. (1988). Catalog of the Heteroptera, True Bugs of Canada and the Continental United States. Brill Academic Publishers.

Further reading

 Arnett, Ross H. (2000). American Insects: A Handbook of the Insects of America North of Mexico. CRC Press.

External links

 NCBI Taxonomy Browser, Drymus crassus

Lygaeoidea
Insects described in 1910